Trunov House is a historic house built in the late 19th - early 20th century, located at 13 Temernitskaya Street in Rostov-on-Don, Russia.

History

In the 1880s the building was owned by Nakhchivan wine trader Jeremiah Ayvazov. In 1888 the house was bought by George Trunov, who established a workshop in the yard.

After 1907 the house was owned by George's brother Ivan. After a few years Ivan Trunov mortgaged the house and got in the Bank 2,500 rubles. In 1914, the house was bought by Eudoxia Rudukhina for 5,000 rubles. The house was nationalized in 1920 and Rudukhina. In the twenty-first century, the building was used for law offices.

Design
The asymmetrical building is constructed of brick-covered plaster. The entrance is on the right side, decorated with columns and a portico, while the left part is made of pilasters.

The building is included in the register of monuments of architecture.

References 

Tourist attractions in Rostov-on-Don
Buildings and structures in Rostov-on-Don
Cultural heritage monuments in Rostov-on-Don
Cultural heritage monuments of regional significance in Rostov Oblast